The 2000 Winnipeg Blue Bombers finished in 3rd place in the East Division with a 7–10–1 record. They appeared in the East Final.

Offseason

CFL Draft

Regular season

Season standings

Season schedule

Playoffs

East Semi-Final

East Final

Awards and records
CFL's Most Outstanding Rookie Award – Albert Johnson III (WR)
CFL's Most Outstanding Special Teams Award – Albert Johnson III (WR)

2000 CFL All-Stars
SB – Milt Stegall, CFL All-Star
ST – Albert Johnson III, CFL All-Star

Eastern All-Star selections
SB – Milt Stegall, CFL Eastern All-Star
WR – Robert Gordon, CFL Eastern All-Star
OT – Moe Elewonibi, CFL Eastern All-Star
ST – Albert Johnson III, CFL Eastern All-Star
LB – Antonio Armstrong, CFL Eastern All-Star

References

Winnipeg Blue Bombers
Winnipeg Blue Bombers seasons